T2000 may refer to:

 Bombardier T2000, a tram design by Bombardier Transportation
 Finnish hovercraft Tuuli (T-2000)
 OS T2000, a train class of the Oslo Metro
 SNCF Class T 2000, a French train class
 Sun T2000, a Sun Fire server model
 a former designation for the RENFE Class 352, a Spanish locomotive class
 The tennis racket Wilson T2000, the first steel tennis racket